Oak is an unincorporated community in Baldwin County, Alabama, United States.

History
A post office operated under the name Oak from 1905 to 1923.

References

Populated coastal places in Alabama
Unincorporated communities in Baldwin County, Alabama
Unincorporated communities in Alabama